Culnaskiach Falls is a waterfall in Boblainy Forest, to the south of the village of Kiltarlity, in the Highland council area of Scotland. It is on a small stream which flows into the Bruiach Burn.

See also
Waterfalls of Scotland

References

Waterfalls of Highland (council area)